The Union Club was an eighteenth century political club in Bristol that organised political support for Whig candidates.  It was opposed to the Tory supporting Steadfast society.

References

Whigs (British political party)
Clubs and societies